Doug Walker is an English singer-songwriter based in Manchester. Walker is best known for his single "The Mystery" which saw a rapid rise to notoriety after being played by BBC Radio 1. Walker gave a copy of the recording to DJ Chris Moyles after turning up outside the Radio 1 studio on 28 August 2007 at 5.30am.  It was played at 7.20am, and the radio station was inundated with emails and SMS texts, resulting in Moyles playing the song seven more times that week. As a result Walker met with eleven record labels and signed with Warner Bros. Records on 12 October 2007.

"The Mystery" was released on 3 March 2008 as a download, and it entered the UK Singles Chart at No. 36 on 9 March. 

Walker's debut album was produced by Danton Supple who was responsible for X&Y by Coldplay and Silence Is Easy by Starsailor. After recording, Walker flew to New York City to mix his album with Michael Brauer, and had allegedly completed his album nine weeks to the day from when he signed his recording contract with Warner Bros. Records. The album was released on CD in 2008, however sales data is not readily available.

Walker toured extensively throughout 2007 and 2008 supporting artists including The Wombats, Kate Nash, Craig David, Amy MacDonald, The Enemy, The Subways and Sam Beeton.

His musical influences include Electric Light Orchestra, Jeff Buckley, U2, Sting, Radiohead, Sergei Rachmaninov, The Divine Comedy, Coldplay, Aqualung and Regina Spektor.

Walker's songs are often influenced by his faith, dealing in themes of hope and reconciliation. Walker has stated that his songs all have links to Christianity, to which he belongs.

Discography

Albums
 'Fear Together' (unreleased)

Singles

References

Year of birth missing (living people)
Living people
English pop singers
English male singer-songwriters
People from Chertsey
Musicians from Manchester